The 2002 Bristol City Council election took place on 2 May 2002, on the same day as other local elections. Despite suffering some losses, the Labour Party managed to retain a slim majority.

Ward Results

Avonmouth

Bedminster

Bishopston

Bishopsworth

Brislington East

Brislington West

Filwood

Hartcliffe

Henbury

Hengrove

Henleaze

Horfield

Kingsweston

Knowle

Lawrence Hill

Lockleaze

Redland

Southmead

Southville

Stockwood

Stoke Bishop

Westbury-on-Trym

Whitchurch Park

Windmill Hill

References

2002 English local elections
2002
2000s in Bristol